The Issam Fares Institute for Public Policy and International Affairs (IFI) is located at the American University of Beirut (AUB). This independent institute develops policy research in the Arab region and provides a space for the exchange of ideas. It is currently headed by Joseph Bahout. The Institute building gained international attention by winning a prestigious architecture award in 2016.

Research 
The Issam Fares Institute for Public Policy and International Affairs (IFI) at the American University of Beirut (AUB) was founded through donations by Lebanese businessman and politician Issam Fares, who also served as Deputy Prime Minister of Lebanon.

IFI aims to harness the policy-related research of AUB's internationally respected faculty in order to achieve several goals: to raise the quality of public policy-related debate and decision-making in the Arab World and abroad, to enhance the Arab World's input into international affairs, and to enrich the quality of interaction among scholars, officials and civil society actors in the Middle East and abroad.

In the established tradition of AUB, IFI is a neutral, dynamic, civil, and open space where people representing all viewpoints in society can gather and discuss significant issues of the day, anchored in a long-standing commitment to mutual understanding and high quality research. IFI brings together and showcases in one place -physically and virtually on the web -the research of AUB scholars related to public policy and international affairs.

IFI acts primarily as catalysts and connectors between AUB, other Arab scholars, and the global research and policy community. This includes collaborative work with colleagues around the region and the world, through ongoing and ad hoc partnerships with other universities, stand-alone think tanks, research centers, and institutions in the private and public sectors.

IFI impacts on national and international policy issues through three principal means:

1. Generating high quality, policy-relevant research texts and analyses in formats that are credible to our varied target audience of policy-makers, bureaucrats, the mass media, scholars, business and civil society leaders, and opinion molders throughout society

2. Hosting public conferences, workshops and other gatherings that bring together policy officials, private sector and civil society leaders, scholars, students and the interested public for frank exchanges of views on timely issues, leading to more clarity and possible consensus on critical policies

3. Facilitating or hosting private gatherings that bring together individuals and groups in the fields of policy-making, civil society, the corporate world and scholarship.

IFI targets multiple audiences with very different needs and interests: academic scholars, students, policy-makers, the mass media, civil society, the private sector, and other research centers in the Middle East and the rest of the world.

IFI activities include the following: Conferences, workshops and symposia; visiting fellows (from a few days to a full year); guest lecturers and ongoing thematic lecture series; visiting researchers; panel discussions and debates; research projects that generate studies, papers, scholarly articles, books; a "working papers" series of articles by AUB and visiting scholars; short policy recommendations, analyses and briefs; opinion and analysis articles and interviews for the press; ad hoc white papers on timely issues; faculty and student exchanges, regionally and globally; internships; private meetings among scholars, activists and officials; an active website that pulls together all public policy and international affairs work at AUB.

Architecture 
The American University of Beirut's (AUB) master plan requested a home for its new think tank that was in harmony with the rest of the campus, had minimal impact on the surrounding greenery, and preserved sight lines to the Mediterranean below despite its location on the upper part of campus. Architecture firm Zaha Hadid Architects won the University's design competition to create this building. Iraqi-British Zaha Hadid was a former AUB student.

The Issam Fares Institute building is 3,000 square feet and made of fair-faced concrete, continuing Lebanon's 20th century construction culture. To reduce the building's footprint, the designers placed a reading room, workshop conference room, and research spaces in a 21-metre-long cantilever, leaving greenspace below. The cantilever acts as a sun shade and maintains a social space on campus.

Designers incorporated the campus' intersecting routes to create a series of interlocking platforms with research and discussion spaces. Second-floor research rooms connect with the rest of the campus via a ramp surrounded by hundred-year-old ficus and cypress trees. The building's height matches the surrounding trees, integrating into its natural surroundings. Last in a series of buildings, the Institute completes an oval courtyard of the AUB's hilltop upper campus.

The contemporary design is a piece of art, representative of its time and pushing the building materials to their physical limit. Described as radical and alien-looking, the design respects its traditional context. As the most modern, dramatic building on campus, the Institute is a controversial conversation piece. Designed to be happy and transparent, like the think tank it houses, the building not only provides space, it makes visitors think as they learn what it is.

In 2016, the same year architect Zaha Hadid died, the building was one of six winners of the Aga Khan Award for Architecture. The award jury notes how the building fits many uses into a small footprint with contemporary architecture that differentiates itself from surrounding buildings while remaining in harmony with the rest of the campus.

References

External links
Site of the Issam Fares Institute on American University of Beirut website

American University of Beirut